Trachelanthus is a genus of flowering plants belonging to the family Boraginaceae.

Its native range is Western and Central Asia.

Species:
 Trachelanthus cerinthoides (Boiss.) Kunze 
 Trachelanthus foliosus (Paine) Tristram 
 Trachelanthus hissaricus Lipsky 
 Trachelanthus korolkowii Lipsky

References

Boraginoideae
Boraginaceae genera